Gnimdéwa Atakpama (born 19 April 1977 in Lomé) is a Togolese journalist, writer and French teacher. 

He has written four children's books as of 2015: La désillusion (2003), Tolo-Tolo (2004), Sauve-souris ! (2011) and Surtout n'entrez pas dans le sac ! (2012), the latter of which was translated into Italian in 2013. In his writing he often draws upon influences from his own childhood. In December 2007 he was the director of the International Storytelling Festival and Arts in Togo.

References

Togolese writers
Togolese journalists
Togolese children's writers
1977 births
Living people
People from Lomé
20th-century Togolese writers
21st-century Togolese writers